Zamyn-Üüd (road's gate) is a sum (district) of Dornogovi Province in southeastern Mongolia. Its population was 11,527 in 2008.

History

Geography

Overview
The town is located on the old trade route between Beijing and Urga/Ulaanbaatar, and is now the most important border crossing between Mongolia and the People's Republic of China, via Erenhot. The border control counted more than 950,000 border crossings in 2004.
In April 2007, the construction of a  paved road from Choir to Zamyn-Üüd via Sainshand began. Completion is planned for October 2007. However, completion of the road project was pushed back to 2013, with Sainshand to Choir section being finished in September, 2013. A new expanded road border crossing was also completed in 2013 to relieve delays in crossing from China to Mongolia.

The "Zamyn-Uud" Free Economic Zone was officially created in 2004. It has an area of 900 ha and is located between Zamyn-Üüd settlement and the Chinese border.

Climate
Zamyn-Üüd has a cold desert climate (Köppen climate classification BWk) with very warm summers and very cold winters. Most precipitation falls in the summer as rain, with some snow in the adjacent months of May and September. Winters are very dry.

References

External links

Populated places in Mongolia
Districts of Dornogovi Province
China–Mongolia border crossings